Twistronics (from twist and electronics) is the study of how the angle (the twist) between layers of two-dimensional materials can change their electrical properties. Materials such as bilayer graphene have been shown to have vastly different electronic behavior, ranging from non-conductive to superconductive, that depends sensitively on the angle between the layers. The term was first introduced by the research group of Efthimios Kaxiras at Harvard University in their theoretical treatment of graphene superlattices.

History 
In 2007, National University of Singapore physicist Antonio Castro Neto hypothesized that pressing two misaligned graphene sheets together might yield new electrical properties, and separately proposed that graphene might offer a route to superconductivity, but he did not combine the two ideas.  In 2010 researchers from Universidad Técnica Federico Santa María in Chile found that for a certain angle close to 1 degree the band of the electronic structure of twisted bilayer graphene became completely flat, and because of that theoretical property, they suggested that collective behavior might be possible. In 2011 Allan MacDonald (of University of Texas at Austin) and Rafi Bistritzer using a simple theoretical model found that for the previously found "magic angle"  the amount of energy a free electron would require to tunnel between two graphene sheets radically changes. In 2017, the research group of Efthimios Kaxiras at Harvard University used detailed quantum mechanics calculations to reduce uncertainty in the twist angle between two graphene layers that can induce extraordinary behavior of electrons in this two-dimensional system. In 2018, Pablo Jarillo-Herrero, an experimentalist at MIT, found that the magic angle resulted in the unusual electrical properties that Allan MacDonald and Rafi Bistritzer had predicted. At 1.1 degrees rotation at sufficiently low temperatures, electrons move from one layer to the other, creating a lattice and the phenomenon of superconductivity.

Publication of these discoveries has generated a host of theoretical papers seeking to understand and explain the phenomena as well as numerous experiments using varying numbers of layers, twist angles and other materials. Subsequent works showed that electronic properties of the stack can also be strongly dependent on heterostrain especially near the magic angle allowing potential applications in straintronics.

Characteristics

Superconduction and Insulation 
The theoretical predictions of superconductivity were confirmed by Pablo Jarillo-Herrero and his student Yuan Cao of MIT and colleagues from Harvard University and the National Institute for Materials Science in Tsukuba, Japan. They created two bilayer devices that acted as an insulator instead of a conductor under a magnetic field. Increasing the field strength turned the second device into a superconductor.

A further advance in twistronics is the discovery of a method of turning the superconductive paths on and off by application of a small voltage differential.

Heterostructures 
Experiments have also been done using combinations of graphene layers with other materials that form heterostructures in the form of atomically thin sheets that are held together by the weak Van der Waals force.  For example, a study published in Science in July 2019 found that with the addition of a boron nitride lattice between two graphene sheets, unique orbital ferromagnetic effects were produced at a 1.17° angle, which could be used to implement memory in quantum computers. Further spectroscopic studies of twisted bilayer graphene revealed strong electron-electron correlations at the magic angle.

Electron Puddling 
Between 2-D layers for bismuth selenide and a dichalcogenide, researchers at the  Northeastern University in Boston, discovered that at a specific degrees of twist a new lattice layer, consisting of only pure electrons, would develop between the two 2-D elemental layers.  The quantum and physical effects of the alignment between the two layers appears to create "puddle" regions which trap electrons into a stable lattice.  Because this stable lattice consists only of electrons, it is the first non-atomic lattice observed and suggests new opportunities to confine, control, measure, and transport electrons.

Ferromagnetism 
A three layer construction, consisting of two layers of graphene with a 2-D layer of boron nitride, has been shown to exhibit superconductivity, insulation and ferromagnetism. In 2021, this was achieved on a single graphene flake.

See also 

 Straintronics – a method for altering the properties of two-dimensional materials by introducing controlled stress
 Spintronics – the study of the intrinsic spin of the electron and its associated magnetic moment in solid-state devices
 Valleytronics – the study of local extrema, valleys, in the electronic band structure of semiconductors

References 

Graphene
Emerging technologies
Superconductivity